Kaftanzoglio Stadium is a sports stadium in Thessaloniki, Greece. The stadium was built with money donated by the Kaftanzoglou Foundation, in honour of Lysandros Kaftanzoglou, hence its name. At the time of its opening on 27 October 1960, the stadium was one of the highest quality stadiums in the Balkans. It currently has 27,770 seats, owing to a comprehensive renovation before reopening to host football matches for the 2004 Summer Olympics, which was centered in Athens. It was the largest stadium in Greece until 1982, but has since been surpassed in capacity by the Olympic Stadium in Athens.

Is has been the home stadium of Iraklis Thessaloniki F.C. since 1960. 

On 15 October 1969, the attendance record was set with 47,458 fans present for a FIFA World Cup qualifying match, witnessing Greece defeat Switzerland by a 4–1 score. In 1973 it hosted the European Cup Winners Cup Final, which resulted in a 1–0 victory for A.C. Milan over Leeds United.

Athletics events

The stadium regularly hosts athletics events. It hosted the Greek national championships in 2009 and it has been used for both athletics at the Mediterranean Games and the European Cup in athletics. It was the host stadium for the 2009 IAAF World Athletics Final.

References

External links

 General Secretariat for Sports
Official Homepage
Stadia.gr

Iraklis Thessaloniki F.C.
Football venues in Greece
Sports venues in Thessaloniki
Venues of the 2004 Summer Olympics
Olympic football venues
Tourist attractions in Thessaloniki
Multi-purpose stadiums in Greece
Athletics (track and field) venues in Greece